George Campbell Gordon (born 11 September 1903) was a rugby union player who represented Australia.

Gordon, a wing, was born in Bowral and claimed 1 international rugby cap for Australia.

References

Australian rugby union players
Australia international rugby union players
1903 births
Year of death missing
Rugby union players from New South Wales
Rugby union wings